The 1995–96 Alabama Crimson Tide men's basketball team represented the University of Alabama in the 1995-96 NCAA Division I men's basketball season. The team's head coach was David Hobbs, who was in his fourth season at Alabama.  The team played their home games at Coleman Coliseum in Tuscaloosa, Alabama. They finished the season with a record of 19–13, with a conference record of 9–7, which placed them in a tie for second in the SEC Western Division.

The Tide lost in the first round of the 1996 SEC men's basketball tournament, where they lost to Tennessee.  The Tide did not receive an at-large bid to the 1996 NCAA tournament. Instead, they received an invitation to 1996 NIT, where they defeated Illinois, Missouri, and South Carolina to earn a semifinal berth, where they were defeated by Saint Joseph's, and then Tulane in the third-place game.

Roster

Schedule and results

|-
!colspan=14 style=| Regular Season

|-
!colspan=9 style=| SEC Tournament

|-
!colspan=9 style=| NIT

Sources

References 

Alabama Crimson Tide men's basketball seasons
Alabama
1995 in sports in Alabama
1996 in sports in Alabama
Alabama